Sõpruse Bridge is a bridge in Tartu, Estonia. This is the longest bridge in Estonia. Its length is 488.2 m and width 26.5 m.

The bridge was opened on 5 December 1981.

See also
 List of bridges in Estonia

References

Bridges in Tartu